The Agenda was a political discussion programme on British television network ITV, broadcast on Monday evenings from 10.45pm. The programme was presented by ITV News anchor Tom Bradby and was first broadcast on 27 February 2012 and it ran for nine series until the show's cancellation on 28 November 2016.

In each episode, Bradby was joined by four guests to discuss the biggest news stories of the previous week and then talk about the week ahead. Guests have included David Cameron, Nick Clegg and Boris Johnson. The programme did not return after 9 series, running until 2016.

Episode Guide

Series 1

Series 2

Series 3

Series 4

Series 5

Series 6

Series 7
The series began on 2 April 2015. Two episodes aired each week in the run up to the 2015 General Election.

Series 8

Series 9

Note: Episodes 4–5 were 60 minutes in length and aired on Tuesdays at 8pm. These two episodes were recorded at The London Studios. Episode 7 was hosted by Robert Peston.

References

External links
 

2010s British political television series
2012 British television series debuts
2016 British television series endings
ITV news shows